The Fleet-class unmanned surface vessel, also called the Common Unmanned Surface Vessel (CUSV) and later the Mine Countermeasures Unmanned Surface Vehicle (MCM USV), is an unmanned surface vessel designed for the United States Navy to be deployed from  and s and intended to conduct mine and anti-submarine warfare missions.  four units of the class have been built; the first was delivered to the U.S. Navy in 2008.

Design and development
The Fleet class is designed to operate for up to 48 hours without interruption.

Designed to match the weight and handling limits of a conventional rigid-hulled inflatable boat, the hull of the Fleet class USV is designed for good seakeeping in most sea states, and the vessels are equipped with advanced controls for autonomous navigation and operation. They are also designed to be converted to manned operation through the replacement of mission modules within a 24-hour period. The vessels of the Fleet class are the first unmanned vessels to be numbered as ships of the United States Navy.

As part of the LCS Mine Countermeasure (MCM) mission package, the boats will act as the Unmanned Influence Sweep System (UISS) (formerly unmanned surface sweep system (USSS)), where they will tow a countermeasure system that emits acoustic and magnetic signals to trigger and detonate influence mines at a safe distance.  It is also capable of carrying other counter-mine payloads, including a side scan sonar and minehunting and sweeping unmanned underwater vehicles, as well as non-lethal weapons and intelligence, surveillance and reconnaissance (ISR) packages.

Due to reliability issues with the Remote Multimission Vehicle (RMMV), the CUSV is being considered as an alternative to perform minehunting in addition to minesweeping.  It is also being tested for deploying off other ships besides the LCS, including a test from an Expeditionary Transfer Dock in fall 2015. The Navy will begin testing the CUSV in August 2016 to see if it can tow the AN/AQS-20A sonar; in 2011, movement of the USV on the water's surface rendered the sonar inaccurate, but since then software and isolation devices became available to compensate.  The vessel could take over minehunting in 2020.

In January 2018, Textron announced the U.S. Navy was studying how to weaponize the CUSV for a surface warfare role. Various payloads are being considered including small missiles, remote gun turrets, and sensors and designators to act as a forward targeting node for larger ships.

Operational history
The first Fleet class , was delivered to the United States Navy's Naval Undersea Warfare Center in May 2008; the second vessel of the class entered service the following month.

In October 2014, Textron Systems won a $33.8 million contract from the U.S. Navy for the Fleet-class as the Common Unmanned Surface Vessel (CUSV).  52 boats are to be produced to equip 24 MCM mission packages with two vessels each, along with six for training and replacements. The CUSV completed its critical design review in November 2015 and moved into production in January 2016, with deliveries planned for early 2017 as part of Increment 3 of the LCS MCM package.

On 22 July 2022, the UISS reached initial operational capability (IOC), formally approving it to begin operating in the fleet.

References

External links 
 

Ships built in Maryland
 
Naval ships of the United States
Unmanned surface vehicles of USA